Lake Ontario is one of the five Great Lakes of North America. It is bounded on the north, west, and southwest by the Canadian province of Ontario, and on the south and east by the U.S. state of New York.  The Canada–United States border spans the centre of the lake.

The Canadian cities of Toronto, Kingston, Mississauga, and Hamilton are located on the lake's northern and western shorelines, while the American city of Rochester is located on the south shore. In the Huron language, the name  means "great lake". Its primary inlet is the Niagara River from Lake Erie.  The last in the Great Lakes chain, Lake Ontario serves as the outlet to the Atlantic Ocean via the Saint Lawrence River, comprising the eastern end of the Saint Lawrence Seaway. The Long Sault control dam, primarily along with the Moses-Saunders Power Dam regulates the water level of the lake.

Geography

Lake Ontario is the easternmost of the Great Lakes and the smallest in surface area (7,340 sq mi, 18,960 km2), although it exceeds Lake Erie in volume (393 cu mi, 1,639 km3). It is the 13th largest lake in the world. As the last lake in the Great Lakes' hydrologic chain, Lake Ontario has the lowest mean surface elevation of the lakes at 243 feet (74 m) above sea level;  lower than its neighbor upstream. The lake's average depth is 47 fathoms 1 foot (283 ft; 86 m), with a maximum depth of 133 fathoms 4 feet (802 ft; 244 m). The lake's primary source is the Niagara River, draining Lake Erie, with the Saint Lawrence River serving as the outlet. The drainage basin covers 24,720 square miles (64,030 km2). As with all the Great Lakes, water levels change both within the year (owing to seasonal changes in water input) and among years (owing to longer-term trends in precipitation). These water level fluctuations are an integral part of lake ecology and produce and maintain extensive wetlands. The lake also has an important freshwater fishery, although it has been negatively affected by factors including overfishing, water pollution and invasive species.

Baymouth bars built by prevailing winds and currents have created a significant number of lagoons and sheltered harbors, mostly near (but not limited to) Prince Edward County, Ontario, and the easternmost shores. Perhaps the best-known example is Toronto Bay, chosen as the site of the Upper Canada capital for its strategic harbor. Other prominent examples include Hamilton Harbour, Irondequoit Bay, Presqu'ile Bay, and Sodus Bay. The bars themselves are the sites of long beaches, such as Sandbanks Provincial Park and Sandy Island Beach State Park. These sand bars are often associated with large wetlands, which support large numbers of plant and animal species, as well as providing important rest areas for migratory birds. Presqu'ile, on the north shore of Lake Ontario, is particularly significant in this regard. One unique feature of the lake is the Z-shaped Bay of Quinte which separates Prince Edward County from the Ontario mainland, save for a  isthmus near Trenton; this feature also supports many wetlands and aquatic plants, as well as associated fisheries.

Major rivers draining into Lake Ontario include the Niagara River, Don River, Humber River, Rouge River, Trent River, Cataraqui River, Genesee River, Oswego River, Black River, Little Salmon River, and the Salmon River.

Geology
The lake basin was carved out of soft, weak Silurian-age rocks by the Wisconsin ice sheet during the last ice age. The action of the ice occurred along the pre-glacial Ontarian River valley which had approximately the same orientation as today's basin. Material that was pushed southward by the ice sheet left landforms such as drumlins, kames, and moraines, both on the modern land surface and the lake bottom, reorganizing the region's entire drainage system. As the ice sheet retreated toward the north, it still dammed the St. Lawrence valley outlet, so the lake surface was at a higher level. This stage is known as Lake Iroquois. During that time the lake drained through present-day Syracuse, New York, into the Mohawk River, thence to the Hudson River and the Atlantic. The shoreline created during this stage can be easily recognized by the (now dry) beaches and wave-cut hills 10 to 25 miles (15 to 40 km) from the present shoreline.

When the ice finally receded from the St. Lawrence valley, the outlet was below sea level, and for a short time, the lake became a bay of the Atlantic Ocean, in association with the Champlain Sea. Gradually the land rebounded from the release of the weight of about 6,500 feet (2,000 m) of ice that had been stacked on it. It is still rebounding about 12 inches (30 cm) per century in the St. Lawrence area. Since the ice receded from the area last, the most rapid rebound still occurs there. This means the lake bed is gradually tilting southward, inundating the south shore and turning river valleys into bays. Both north and south shores experience shoreline erosion, but the tilting amplifies this effect on the south shore, causing loss to property owners.

Climate

The lake has a natural seiche rhythm of eleven minutes. The seiche effect normally is only about  inch (2 cm) but can be greatly amplified by earth movement, winds, and atmospheric pressure changes. Because of its great depth, the lake as a whole does not completely freeze in winter, but an ice sheet covering between 10% and 90% of the lake area typically develops, depending on the severity of the winter. Ice sheets typically form along the shoreline and in slack water bays, where the lake is not as deep. During the winters of 1877 and 1878, the ice sheet coverage was up to 95–100% of the lake. During the War of 1812, the ice cover was stable enough the American naval commander stationed at Sackets Harbor feared a British attack from Kingston, over the ice. The lake has completely frozen over on five recorded occasions: in 1830, 1874, 1893, 1912, and 1934.

When the cold winds of winter pass over the warmer water of the lake, they pick up moisture and drop it as lake-effect snow. Since the prevailing winter winds are from the northwest, the southern and southeastern shoreline of the lake is referred to as the snowbelt. In some winters, the area between Oswego and Pulaski may receive twenty or more feet (600 cm) of snowfall. The "Hill", as it is often referred to, typically receives more snow than any other region in the eastern United States. As a result, Tug Hill is a popular location for winter enthusiasts, such as snow-mobilers and cross-country skiers. Lake-effect snow often extends inland as far as Syracuse, with that city often recording the most winter snowfall accumulation of any large city in the United States. Other cities in the world receive more snow annually, such as Quebec City, which averages , and Sapporo, Japan, which receives  each year and is often regarded as the snowiest city in the world. 

Foggy conditions (particularly in fall) can be created by thermal contrasts and can be an impediment for recreational boaters. Lake breezes in spring tend to retard fruit bloom until the frost danger is past, and in the autumn delay the onset of fall frost, particularly on the south shore. Cool onshore winds also retard the early bloom of plants and flowers until later in the spring season, protecting them from possible frost damage. Such microclimatic effects have enabled tender fruit production in a continental climate, with the southwest shore supporting a major fruit-growing area. Apples, cherries, pears, plums, and peaches are grown in many commercial orchards around Rochester. Between Stoney Creek and Niagara-on-the-Lake on the Niagara Peninsula is a major fruit-growing and wine-making area. The wine-growing region extends over the international border into Niagara and Orleans counties in New York. Apple varieties that tolerate a more extreme climate are grown on the lake's north shore, around Cobourg.

Ecology

The Great Lakes watershed is a region of high biodiversity, and Lake Ontario is important for its diversity of birds, fish, reptiles, amphibians, and plants.  Many of these special species are associated with shorelines, particularly sand dunes, lagoons, and wetlands. The importance of wetlands to the lake has been appreciated, and many of the larger wetlands have protected status.  These wetlands are changing, partly because the natural water level fluctuations have been reduced.  Many wetland plants are dependent upon low water levels to reproduce. When water levels are stabilized, the area and diversity of the marsh is reduced.  This is particularly true of meadow marsh (also known as wet meadow wetlands); for example, in Eel Bay near Alexandria Bay, regulation of lake levels has resulted in large losses of wet meadow.  Often this is accompanied by the invasion of cattails, which displace many of the native plant species and reduce plant diversity. Eutrophication may accelerate this process by providing nitrogen and phosphorus for the more rapid growth of competitively dominant plants. Similar effects are occurring on the north shore, in wetlands such as Presqu'ile, which have interdunal wetlands called pannes, with high plant diversity and many unusual plant species.

Most of the forests around the lake are deciduous forests dominated by trees including maple, oak, beech, ash and basswood.  These are classified as part of the Mixedwood Plains Ecozone by Environment Canada, or as the Eastern Great Lakes and Hudson Lowlands by the United States Environmental Protection Agency, or as the Great Lakes Ecoregion by The Nature Conservancy. Deforestation in the vicinity of the lake has had many negative impacts, including loss of forest birds, extinction of native salmon, and increased amounts of sediment flowing into the lake. In some areas, more than 90 percent of the forest cover has been removed and replaced by agriculture.  Certain tree species, such as hemlock, have also been particularly depleted by past logging activity. Guidelines for restoration stress the importance of maintaining and restoring forest cover, particularly along streams and wetlands.

By the 1960s and 1970s, the increased pollution caused frequent algal blooms to occur in the summer. These blooms killed large numbers of fish, and left decomposing piles of filamentous algae and dead fish along the shores.

Human history
The name Ontario is derived from the Huron word Ontarí'io, which means "great lake". In Colonial times, the lake was also called Cataraqui, a French spelling of the Mohawk Katarokwi. The lake was a border between the Huron people and the Iroquois Confederacy in the pre-Columbian era. In the 15th century, the Iroquois drove out the Huron from southern Ontario and settled the northern shores of Lake Ontario. When the Iroquois withdrew and the Anishnabeg / Ojibwa / Mississaugas moved in from the north to southern Ontario, they retained the Iroquois name. Artifacts believed to be of Norse origin have been found in the area of Sodus Bay, indicating the possibility of trading by the indigenous peoples with Norse explorers on the east coast of North America.

It is believed the first European to reach the lake was Étienne Brûlé in 1615. As was their practice, the French explorers introduced other names for the lake. In 1632 and 1656, the lake was referred to as Lac de St. Louis or Lake St. Louis by Samuel de Champlain and cartographer Nicolas Sanson respectively (likely for Louis XIV of France) In 1660, Jesuit historian Francis Creuxius coined the name Lacus Ontarius.  In a map drawn in the Relation des Jésuites (1662–1663), the lake bears the legend "Lac Ontario ou des Iroquois" with the name "Ondiara" in smaller type. A French map produced in 1712 (currently in the Canadian Museum of History), created by military engineer Jean-Baptiste de Couagne, identified Lake Ontario as "Lac Frontenac" named after Louis de Buade, Comte de Frontenac et de Palluau. He was a French soldier, courtier, and Governor General of New France from 1672 to 1682 and from 1689 to his death in 1698.

In the 17th century, reports of an alleged creature named Gaasyendietha, similar to the so-called Loch Ness Monster, being sighted in the lake. The creature is described as large with a long neck, green in colour, and generally causes a break in the surface waves.

A series of trading posts were established by both the British and French, such as Fort Frontenac in 1673, Fort Oswego in 1722, and Fort Rouillé in 1750. As the easternmost and nearest lake to the Atlantic seaboard of Canada and the United States, population centres here are among the oldest in the Great Lakes basin, with Kingston, Ontario, formerly the capital of Canada, dating to the establishment of Fort Frontenac in 1673.  

After the French and Indian War, all forts around the lake were under British control. The United States took possession of the forts along the American side of the lake at the signing of the Jay Treaty in 1794. Permanent, non-military European settlement began during the American Revolution with the influx of Loyalist settlers. During the War of 1812, the Royal Navy and US Navy had fought in several engagements for control of Lake Ontario.   The Great Lakes, including Lake Ontario, were largely demilitarized after the Rush–Bagot Treaty was ratified in 1818.

The lake became a hub of commercial activity following the War of 1812 with canal building on both sides of the border and heavy travel by lake steamers. Steamer activity peaked in the mid-19th century before competition from railway lines.

In the late 19th and early 20th centuries, a type of scow known as a stone hooker was in operation on the northwest shore, particularly around Port Credit and Bronte. Stonehooking was the practice of raking flat fragments of Dundas shale from the shallow lake floor of the area for use in construction, particularly in the growing city of Toronto.

Swims across the lake

, nearly 50 people have successfully swam across the lake. The first person who accomplished the feat was a Canadian long distance swimmer Marilyn Bell, who did it in 1954 at age 16. Toronto's Marilyn Bell Park is named in her honour.  The park opened in 1984 and is east of the spot where Bell completed her swim. In 1974, Diana Nyad became the first person who swam across the lake against the current (from north to south). On August 28, 2007, 14-year-old Natalie Lambert from Kingston, Ontario, made the swim, leaving Sackets Harbor, New York, and reaching Kingston's Confederation basin less than 24 hours after she entered the lake. On August 19, 2012, 14-year-old Annaleise Carr became the youngest person to swim across the lake.  She completed the 32-mile (52-km) crossing from Niagara-on-the-Lake to Marilyn Bell Park in just under 27 hours.

Settlements
A large conurbation called the Golden Horseshoe occupies the lake's westernmost shores, anchored by the cities of Toronto and Hamilton. Ports on the Canadian side include St. Catharines, Oshawa, Cobourg and Kingston, near the St. Lawrence River outlet. Close to 9 million people, or over a quarter of Canada's population, live within the watershed of Lake Ontario. The American shore is largely rural, with the exception of Rochester and the much smaller ports at Oswego and Sackets Harbor. Over 2 million people live in Lake Ontario's American watershed.

 Ontario, Canada

 Toronto
 Mississauga
 Hamilton
 Burlington
 Oshawa
 Kingston
 Whitby
 Stoney Creek
 Grimsby
 Oakville
 St. Catharines
 Port Hope
 Cobourg
 Brighton
 Pickering
 Ajax
 Bowmanville
 Belleville
 Trenton
 Niagara-on-the-Lake

 New York, United States

 Rochester
 Greece
 Irondequoit
 Webster
 Oswego
 Fair Haven
 Sackets Harbor
 Cape Vincent
 Three Mile Bay
 Wilson
 Chaumont
 Olcott
 Sodus Point

Islands

Several islands exist in the lake, the largest of which being Wolfe Island. Nearly all of Lake Ontario's islands are on the eastern and northeastern shores, between the Prince Edward County headland and the lake's outlet at Kingston, underlain by the basement rock found throughout the region. However, there exist several islands in the northwestern portion of the lake. Notable islands include:

 Amherst Island
 Association Island
 Big Island
 Galloo Island
 Garden Island
 Grenadier Island
 Little Galloo Island
 Nicholson Island
 Simcoe Island
 Toronto Islands (an island chain of 15 smaller islands)
 Waupoos Island
 Wolfe Island

Navigation
The Great Lakes Waterway connects the lake sidestream to the Atlantic Ocean via the Saint Lawrence Seaway and upstream to the other rivers in the chain via the Welland Canal and to Lake Erie. The Trent-Severn Waterway for pleasure boats connects Lake Ontario at the Bay of Quinte to Georgian Bay (Lake Huron) via Lake Simcoe. The Oswego Canal connects the lake at Oswego to the New York State Canal System, with outlets to the Hudson River, Lake Erie, and Lake Champlain. The Rideau Canal, also for pleasure boats, connects Lake Ontario at Kingston to the Ottawa River in downtown Ottawa, Ontario.

Several lighthouses exists throughout the lake to help with navigation. Notable historic examples include:

 Braddock Point Light
 Charlotte-Genesee Lighthouse
 Gibraltar Point Lighthouse
 Oswego Harbor West Pierhead Light
 Presqu'ile Lighthouse
 Selkirk Lighthouse
 Sodus Point Light
 Stony Point Light
 Thirty Mile Point Light

A land-based trail that roughly follows the lake's shoreline also exists, the Great Lakes Circle Tour and Seaway Trail. The designated scenic road systems connects all of the Great Lakes and the St. Lawrence River. As the Seaway Trail is posted on the U.S. side only, Lake Ontario is the only of the five Great Lakes to have no posted bi-national circle tour.

Economic impacts

Lake Ontario is the site of several major commercial ports including the Port of Toronto and the Port of Hamilton. Hamilton Harbour is the location of major steel production facilities.

The government of Ontario, which holds the lakebed rights of the Canadian portion of the lake under the Beds of Navigable Waters Act, does not permit wind power to be generated offshore. In Trillium Power Wind Corporation v. Ontario (Natural Resources), the Superior Court of Justice held Trillium Power—since 2004 an "Applicant of Record" who had invested $35,000 in fees and, when in 2011 the Crown made a policy decision against offshore windfarms, claimed an injury of $2.25 billion—disclosed no reasonable cause of action.

The Great Lakes once supported an industrial-scale fishery, with record hauls in 1899, overfishing later blighted the industry. However, only recreational fishing activities exist in the 21st century.

See also

Charity Shoal Crater
Glacial Lake Admiralty
Lake Ontario Waterkeeper
Ontario Lacus, a hydrocarbon lake on Saturn's moon Titan named after Lake Ontario

Great Lakes in general

Great Lakes Areas of Concern
Great Lakes census statistical areas
Great Lakes Commission
Great Recycling and Northern Development Canal
Great Storm of 1913
International Boundary Waters Treaty
List of cities along the Great Lakes
Sixty Years' War for control of the Great Lakes
Third Coast

References

Bibliography

External links

Lake Ontario NOAA nautical chart #14820 online
EPA's Great Lakes Atlas
Great Lakes Coast Watch
Lake Ontario Bathymetry

 
Ontario, Lake
Ontario, Lake
Saint Lawrence Seaway
Canada–United States border
Ontario
Ontario